Safedom is a Chinese condom manufacturer based in Beijing. Founded in 2006, it grew rapidly in China and was planning to sell 1 billion condoms in China in 2012, approximately 8% of the domestic market. Four-fifths of Safedom's customers in China are women, since its marketing emphasises female health benefits.

The company claimed to produce the first virus-proof condom.

Safedom competes with Durex and other condom-makers in Europe and elsewhere.

References

External links
Official Safedom website (English)

Condom brands
Manufacturing companies based in Beijing
Health care companies established in 2006
Chinese brands
Manufacturing companies established in 2006
Chinese companies established in 2006